= Old Randfontein mine =

Uranium mine in Gauteng, South Africa

- Location within South Africa
- Location: Gauteng, South Africa; 26°8′8.84″S 27°44′55.54″E
- Products: uranium

The Old Randfontein mine is a large mine located in the northern part of South Africa in Gauteng. Old Randfontein represents one of the largest uranium reserves in South Africa having estimated reserves of 247.2 million tonnes of ore grading 0.025% uranium.
